This is a list of the journalists killed in Pakistan:

Janullah Hashimzada
Murtaza Razvi
Daniel Pearl

See also 

 List of journalists killed during the Balochistan conflict (1947–present)

References
Detailed list of all 57 Journalists killed in Pakistan in last 20 years

Pakistan
 
Journalists killed